, alternatively titled as Sonzai no Kyoukai, is an upcoming Philippine 3D animated short film. It is dubbed by the local media as the country's "first 3DCG anime" due to the use of 3-Dimensional Computer Graphics and its artstyle similar to Japanese animation.

Synopsis
The story of Division of Existence is set in the year 2030 where humanity discovered another world inhabited by paranormal beings such as demons. A military organization called Global Security was established to prevent these paranormal entities from entering the human world who also built a 9 underground containment prison facility to detain paranormal entities. The main protagonist of the film, John Salazar is a warden who is tasked to guard the 7th containment prison faces a jailbreak. The prison operators rush to secure the gate which will allow the paranormal beings to enter the human world. Salazar is aided by Akari and Akira Kato, as well as his former mentor RV Gale.

Production
Division of Existence is a 10-minute short film, being produced by a Cagayan de Oro-based team which goes by the name of Team XGN. The team is led by Dave Gadrinab, who also works on the film's story, character and environment design, as well as its animation and rendering. The film is produced using the open-sourced software Blender, making use of both 2D and 3D animation. Years before the film's production, Gadrinab was mentored under Vicente Carro and Tamakoshi Masaki, Blender NPR artists and owners of a Japanese animation studio based in the Gifu prefecture.

Gadrinab works with at least five others for the film's production. Brad Arces is responsible for the animatics and story board. Caleb Mills is also responsible for the story and script, Linil Komban and Sri Mule does the character animation, and Joseph Manuel handle the sound effects and background music. Some members of the team are based outside the country and thus contributes to the project online while some works with Gadrinab in Cagayan de Oro.

The projected time period for the film's production, which began on November 15, 2016, is 8 to 10 months. Production was put on hold until it was restarted in March 2017.

For the financing of the film's production, Team XGN crowdsourced through Patreon.

Themes
Team XGN describes Division of Existence as a horror action military science fiction film in terms of genre. The film was inspired from science fiction films from the 1980s and 1990s such as Aliens, Predator and Event Horizon.

Release
As of April 2017, the film project has no official studio partners. Division of Existence is planned to be released in December 2017. Gadrinab, Team XGN's lead, says the film will be released online through video sharing platforms such as YouTube. The film will be released in both English and Japanese. The original soundtrack of the film was done by IRON ATTACK!!

Merchandising for the film is headed by Elroy Zagada Uta.

References

External links
 

Philippine short films
Philippine computer-animated films
2017 animated films
2017 films
Films set in prison
Philippine horror films
Philippine science fiction films
Films set in 2030